Guy Tracey (15 April 1896 – 22 November 1965) was a British bobsledder. He competed in the four-man event at the 1928 Winter Olympics.

References

1896 births
1965 deaths
British male bobsledders
Olympic bobsledders of Great Britain
Bobsledders at the 1928 Winter Olympics
Sportspeople from London